I Love My Country may refer to:

 I Love My Country (Dutch TV series), a Dutch television program and international franchise
 I Love My Country (British TV series), the UK version
 "I Love My Country" (song), by Florida Georgia Line, 2020